Lane Fenner (born December 7, 1945) is a former American football wide receiver. He played for the San Diego Chargers in 1968.

References

1945 births
Living people
American football wide receivers
Florida State Seminoles football players
Players of American football from Indiana
San Diego Chargers players
Sportspeople from Evansville, Indiana